The Imperfect Lady is a 1947 American drama film directed by Lewis Allen and starring Ray Milland, Teresa Wright and Cedric Hardwicke, filmed in 1945 and not released until 1947. In the late Victorian Britain an aristocratic politician falls in love with a showgirl. The film is also known by the alternative title Mrs. Loring's Secret.

Plot
In 1892, showgirls Millie and Rose have a chance encounter with Clive Loring, a politician who invites them to tea. Millie falls for Clive and vows to give up the stage, but his brother Lord Belmont nevertheless disapproves.

Going out in public in stage makeup, Millie and Rose are mistaken for prostitutes. And a man Millie spends a few innocent hours with, Jose Martinez, is arrested for a murder. His only chance of being proven innocent is if Millie will provide an alibi, but she denies knowing him, fearing it will reflect poorly on Clive.

Lord Belmont's suspicions are confirmed when he attends the trial. Martinez is convicted, but it's obvious he was telling the truth in identifying Millie as the woman he'd been with at the time.

Millie is coerced into testifying as a public outcry begins for Clive to resign from Parliament. But despite the uproar, Clive decides to remain true to his love.

Cast
 Ray Milland as Clive Loring 
 Teresa Wright as Millicent Hopkins 
 Cedric Hardwicke as Lord Belmont 
 Virginia Field as Rose Bridges 
 Anthony Quinn as Jose Martínez 
 Reginald Owen as Mr. Hopkins 
 Melville Cooper as Lord Montglyn 
 Rhys Williams as Inspector Carston 
 George Zucco as Mr. Mallam 
 Charles Coleman as Sam Travers 
 Miles Mander as Mr. Rogan 
 Gordon Richards as Gladstone 
 Edmund Breon as Lord Chief Justice 
 Frederick Worlock as Henderson 
 Michael Dyne as Malcolm Gadby 
 Joan Winfield as Lucy 
 Lillian Fontaine as Mrs. Gunner
 Gordon Richards as Gladstone
 Ted Billings as Chimney Sweep (uncredited) 
 Harry Cording as Policeman (uncredited) 
 John Goldsworthy as Bobby (uncredited)
 Olaf Hytten as Butler (uncredited)

References

External links
 

1947 films
Films directed by Lewis Allen
Paramount Pictures films
Films scored by Victor Young
Films set in the 1890s
Films set in England
Films set in London
American historical drama films
1940s historical drama films
American black-and-white films
1947 drama films
1940s English-language films
1940s American films